S100 calcium-binding protein A13 (S100A13) is a protein that in humans is encoded by the S100A13 gene.

Function 

The protein encoded by this gene is a member of the S100 family of proteins containing 2 EF-hand calcium-binding motifs. S100 proteins are localized in the cytoplasm and/or nucleus of a wide range of cells, and involved in the regulation of a number of cellular processes such as cell cycle progression and differentiation. S100 genes include at least 13 members which are located as a cluster on chromosome 1q21. This protein is widely expressed in various types of tissues with a high expression level in thyroid gland. In smooth muscle cells, this protein co-expresses with other family members in the nucleus and in stress fibers, suggesting diverse functions in signal transduction. Multiple alternatively spliced transcript variants encoding the same protein have been found for this gene.

Interactions 

S100A13 has been shown to interact with SYT1 and FGF1.

Pathology 

Up-regulation of S100A13 was detected in cystic papillary thyroid carcinoma and association of S100A13 expression and chemotherapy resistance was shown in proteomics study of melanoma.

References

Further reading 

 
 
 
 
 
 
 
 
 
 
 
 
 
 
 

S100 proteins